Alfred Jacob Sellers (March 2, 1836 – September 20, 1908) was an American soldier who fought for the Union Army during the American Civil War. He received the Medal of Honor for valor.

Biography
Sellers fought at the Battle of Fredericksburg and had to leave the battlefield due to a serious injury.

He received the Medal of Honor on July 21, 1894 for his actions at the Battle of Gettysburg.  The Eleventh Army Corps were being forced back by confederate forces on the afternoon of July 1, 1863.  Although not in command, Sellers personally rushed to the front to organize movement of the Union lines which allowed effective fire into the Alabama Brigade.  These actions saved the Eleventh Army Corps from potential annihilation.

He died on September 20, 1908 and was interred at Mount Vernon Cemetery in Philadelphia, Pennsylvania.

Medal of Honor citation

Citation:

"Voluntarily led the regiment under a withering fire to a position from which the enemy was repulsed."

See also

List of American Civil War Medal of Honor recipients: Q-S

References

External links

Military Times

1836 births
1908 deaths
American Civil War recipients of the Medal of Honor
Burials at Mount Vernon Cemetery (Philadelphia)
Military personnel from Pennsylvania
People from Bucks County, Pennsylvania
People of Pennsylvania in the American Civil War
Union Army soldiers
United States Army Medal of Honor recipients